1970 in Korea may refer to:
1970 in North Korea
1970 in South Korea